Cape Blanche is a headland located on the west coast of Eyre Peninsula in South Australia about  south south-west of the town of Streaky Bay and about  west of the town of Sceale Bay.

History
While it is within the coastline first charted by Matthew Flinders on 9 February 1802, it is not named by Flinders possibly due to the coastline being obscured by a thick haze.  The cape is reported as being one of the sixteen features named in South Australia after Blanche Ann Skurray, the wife of Richard Graves MacDonnell, the sixth Governor of South Australia who served from 1855 to 1862.

Location
The cape has been within the boundary of the Cape Blanche Conservation Park since 2012 while the waters adjoining its shoreline have been within a sanctuary zone in the West Coast Bays Marine Park also since 2012.

References

b
Eyre Peninsula
Great Australian Bight